Karol Butryn (born 18 June 1993) is a Polish professional volleyball player. He is a member of the Poland national team. At the professional club level, he plays for Indykpol AZS Olsztyn.

Honours

Individual awards
 2021: Polish Championship – Best Scorer (552)
 2021: Polish Championship – Best Spiker

References

External links

 Player profile at PlusLiga.pl 
 Player profile at Volleybox.net

1993 births
Living people
Sportspeople from Lublin Voivodeship
Polish men's volleyball players
GKS Katowice (volleyball) players
Czarni Radom players
Resovia (volleyball) players
AZS Olsztyn players
Opposite hitters
20th-century Polish people
21st-century Polish people